The 2019 McNeese State Cowboys football team represents McNeese State University in the 2019 NCAA Division I FCS football season as a member of the Southland Conference. The Cowboys are led by first-year head coach Sterlin Gilbert and play their home games at Cowboy Stadium in Lake Charles, Louisiana.

Previous season
The Cowboys finished the 2018 season 6–5, 5–4 in Southland play to finish in a four-way tie for fourth place.

On November 20, head coach Lance Guidry was fired. He finished at McNeese State with a three-year record of 21–12. On December 5, the school hired South Florida offensive coordinator Sterlin Gilbert as head coach.

Preseason

Preseason poll
The Southland Conference released their preseason poll on July 18, 2019. The Cowboys were picked to finish in sixth place.

Preseason All–Southland Teams
The Cowboys placed three players on the preseason all–Southland teams.

Offense

1st team

Grant Burguillos – OL

Defense

1st team

Chris Livings – DL

Colby Burton – DB

Roster

Schedule

Game summaries

Southern

at Oklahoma State

Alcorn State

at Abilene Christian

Sam Houston State

Southeastern Louisiana

at Central Arkansas

Houston Baptist

at Stephen F. Austin

Northwestern State

at Nicholls

at Lamar

Ranking movements

References

McNeese State
McNeese Cowboys football seasons
McNeese State Cowboys football